The 16th Vojvodina Division was a Yugoslav Partisan division that fought against the Germans, Independent State of Croatia (NDH) and Chetniks in occupied Democratic Federal Yugoslavia during World War II.

When it was created, the 16th Vojvodina Division consisted of mostly Serbs recruited from Hungarian–occupied Bačka. It constituted the first, second, and third Vojvodinian Brigades and had about 3,000 units when it was formed. By 1941, the Partisan rank-and-file was still predominantly Serbian. The Partisans initial successes included the liberation of the area that surrounded the Serbian town of Užice.

As part of the Partisan 3rd Corps then Partisan 12th Corps it spent most of 1944 engaged in hard fighting against the 13th Waffen Mountain Division of the SS Handschar (1st Croatian) in eastern Bosnia. The division participated in the Seventh Offensive from March to June 1944.

The division's later conflict with the Chetniks, which grew into a civil war, was rooted on the dispute between the pro-Communist and the nationalist wings of the Serb rebellion.

The Division also participated in the Battle of Batina (November 1944).

Notes

References
 
 
 
 
 
 

Divisions of the Yugoslav Partisans